SWRV (pronounced 'swerve') was an American music video television channel from Music Choice that launched on February 10, 2010.  SWRV relaunched as Music Choice Play on October 15, 2013.

References

Companies based in New York City
Music video networks in the United States
Defunct television networks in the United States
Television channels and stations established in 2010
Television channels and stations disestablished in 2013
Interactive television